Matija Greguric (born 17 September 1996) is a Croatian male hammer thrower, who won an individual gold medal at the Youth World Championships.

References

External links

1996 births
Living people
Croatian male hammer throwers